Bečej is a town and municipality located in the South Bačka District of the autonomous province of Vojvodina, Serbia. The town has a population of 23,895, while the municipality has 37,351 inhabitants. It is a multiethnic town, predominantly inhabited by Serbs and Hungarians.

History
Bečej was mentioned first during the administration of the Kingdom of Hungary in 1091 under its Latin name Bechey and later in 1238 under Hungarian name Becse. The name probably originated from the Bechey family that had possessions in this area. In the 15th century (from 1419 to 1441) the town was a possession of the Serbian despot Đurađ Branković. In the end of the 15th century, the army of the Kingdom of Hungary led by Serbian despot Vuk Grgurević (Zmaj Ognjeni Vuk) defeated the Ottoman army near Bečej. In 1551, an Ottoman army led by Mehmed paša Sokolović conquered the town. Bečej was administered by the Ottomans between 1551 and 1687 (nominally to 1699) and was part of the Sanjak of Segedin, which was initially in Budin eyalet, latterly in Eğri Eyalet. In Ottoman Turkish it was known as "Beçe".

In the end of the 17th century the Ottoman administration was replaced by a Habsburg one and the settlement was populated by ethnic Serbs from Banat who had run away from the Ottoman Empire. Between 1702 and 1751, the town belonged to the Tisza-Maros section of the Habsburg Military Frontier. After the abolishment of this part of the Frontier in 1751, many Serbs from the town emigrated to Russia (notably to New Serbia and Slavo-Serbia). They founded a new settlement with name Bečej in New Serbia. To prevent this emigration, the Habsburg authorities formed the autonomous District of Potisje with seat in Becse. The District of Potisje was in existence between 1751 and 1848. Three privileges were given to the district in 1759, 1774 and 1800 respectively. The first privilege of the District defined its autonomous status, while the second one allowed ethnic Hungarians to settle in the district. In the following period many Hungarians settled in Becse (the first ones in 1757) and gradually replaced the Serbs as the dominant ethnicity in the town. In 1751, the entire population of the town had been composed of Serbs, while in 1774 half of the population was made up of Serbs and another half was composed of Hungarians. According to the 1910 census, the population of Becse municipality numbered 54,275 people, of whom 30,465 spoke Hungarian and 22,821 Serbian. The town of Becse had 19,372 inhabitants in 1910, of which 12,488 spoke Hungarian (64.46%), 6,582 Serbian (33.98%) and 193 German (1%).

A Serb elementary school in Becse was opened in 1703; it is one of the oldest schools in Vojvodina as well as the first elementary school among Serbs. A Hungarian elementary school was opened in Bečej in 1765, while the Jewish elementary school was opened in 1882. A Serb reading house was opened in 1862, and a Hungarian reading house was opened in 1869.

In 1918 Bečej became part of the Kingdom of Serbs, Croats and Slovenes and subsequent South Slavic states. During the Hungarian Axis occupation, in the 1942 raid, 215 inhabitants of the town were murdered by Hungarian forces, of whom 111 were men, 72 women, 13 children, and 19 elders. By nationality, the victims included 110 Jews, 102 Serbs, and 1 Hungarian.

Inhabited places

Bečej municipality includes the town of Bečej and the following villages:
 Bačko Gradište (Hungarian: Bácsföldvár)
 Bačko Petrovo Selo (Hungarian: Péterréve)
 Mileševo (Hungarian: Kutaspuszta and Drea)
 Radičević (Also known as Čikerija)

Note: for settlements with absolute or relative Hungarian majority names are also given in Hungarian.

There are also several sub-settlements in the municipality, including:
 Poljanice (Hungarian: Pecesor)
 Novo Selo
 Drljan

Demographics

Bečej is an ethnically mixed town and municipality. Settlements with a Hungarian ethnic majority are: Bačko Petrovo Selo and Mileševo. There is one settlement with a Serb ethnic majority: Radičević. Two settlements: Bečej and Bačko Gradište are ethnically mixed.

The ethnic composition of the municipality:

Economy
The following table gives a preview of total number of registered people employed in legal entities per their core activity (as of 2018):

Notable people 

 Janika Balaž, Romani tamburica musician
 Dejan Perić, Serbian handball player
 Aleksandar Popović Sandor, first Serb geologist
 Carl von Than, Austro-Hungarian chemist
 Mór Than, Hungarian painter
 Aleksandar Maćašev, Serbian artist and designer
 Emeric Feher, French photographer
 Marko Tomićević, Serbian sprint canoer, Olympic silver medalist, World and European champion
 Marko Novaković, Serbian sprint canoer, World and European champion
 Dejan Terzić, Serbian sprint canoer
 Borislava Perić, Serbian table tennis player, Paralympic champion and three-time silver medalist
 Melinda Nadj Abonji, Swiss writer born in Bečej
 Milos Sarcev, IFBB professional bodybuilder and coach
 Slobodan Kalinic, Serbian basketball coach 
 Porfirije, Serbian Patriarch

International relations

Twin towns – Sister cities
Bečej is twinned with:
  Miercurea-Ciuc, Romania
  Szekszárd, Hungary
  Csongrád, Hungary

Sports
Bečej is famous for its water polo club VK Bečej which won LEN Champions League in 2000. when the city of Bečej was the host of Final Four.

See also
 List of cities, towns and villages in Vojvodina
 Fantast Castle, 19th-century castle in the vicinity of Bečej
 Sojaprotein, agribusiness company based in Bečej

References
 Slobodan Ćurčić, Broj stanovnika Vojvodine, Novi Sad, 1996.
 Zvonimir Golubović, Racija u južnoj Bačkoj 1942. godine, Novi Sad, 1991.
 Jovan Mirosavljević, Brevijar ulica Novog Sada 1745–2001, Novi Sad, 2002.

Footnotes

External links

 Municipality of Bečej
 Court of Bečej
 Bečejski mozaik - The oldest Newspaper and Magazine
 Public media of Bečej
 Youth association of Bečej
 History of the town  

 
Populated places in South Bačka District
Places in Bačka
Municipalities and cities of Vojvodina
Towns in Serbia
Spatial Cultural-Historical Units of Great Importance